Samoa competed in the 2014 Commonwealth Games in Glasgow, Scotland from 23 July – 3 August 2014. Participating in the Commonwealth Games for the eleventh time, Samoans have won sixteen medals (of which three gold) during their first ten participations. All three of those previous gold medals came in weightlifting at the 2010 Commonwealth Games, and two of the champions (Faavae Faauliuli and Ele Opeloge) are defending their titles in Glasgow.

Medalists

Athletics

Men

Judo

Men

Rugby sevens

Samoa has qualified a rugby sevens team.

Pool C

Shooting

Men
Shotgun

Swimming

Men

Women

Weightlifting

Men

Women

References

Nations at the 2014 Commonwealth Games
Samoa at the Commonwealth Games
2014 in Samoan sport